Weightlifting at the 2009 Pacific Mini Games was held at the Telecom Sports Arena in the Cook Islands capital of Rarotonga on 29 September – 1 October 2009.

Fourteen nations had registered a total of 81 athletes for weightlifting, of which 57 took part in the competition. Only Tahiti did  not win a medal.

Medal summary

Medal table

Men
Eight weight classes were contested for men, with three sets of medals offered within each class for the Snatch, Clean & Jerk, and Total lifts.

Women
Five weight classes were contested for women, with three set of medals offered within each class for the Snatch, Clean & Jerk, and Total lifts.

Notes
 The medal tally for weightlifting as recorded on pages 38–39 of the VIIIth Pacific Mini Games Report, corresponds with the men's and women's tallies from the official website's Results, except for one anomaly. The report lists seven bronze medals (one extra) for Fiji and three bronze medals (one fewer) for Tonga. The extra bronze medal for Fiji is contradicted by Weightlifting Fiji in their annual report published a month after the competition: "Fiji won eight gold, three silver and six bronze medals in weightlifting at the 2009 Pacific Mini Games".
A possible source for this anomaly is within the records for the men's 69 kg class, as marked up with a (sky blue background) in the tables above. The official website's Medal Winners, has Bill Andrews of Fiji listed as the bronze medallist for all three events (: This list contains other errors including nationality mismatches. e.g. Fijians are listed as from Niue, and New Caledonians as from Federated States of Micronesia). However, the official website's Results has Ilaniume Finau of Tonga as the bronze medallist in the Men's 69 kg Snatch. 
Other sources also indicate that Fiji's Bill Andrews won only two of the three bronze medals in the 69 kg class, including Weightlifting Fiji's Annual Report. and news outlets including the Fiji Sun, Other reports confirm Samoa's Toafitu Perive took silver in the Men's 69 kg Snatch, not Ilaniume Finau of Tonga.
In the absence of other evidence (such as a disqualification causing the Fijian to be promoted) the tallies from the official website's Results, are used for this page.

 Some medals were not awarded if there were insufficient competitors in the field. There was no silver or bronze medal given for any of the three events in the Women's 58kg class, and no bronze medal given for any of the three events in the Women's 63kg class. Only one bronze medal was given for the Women's 75kg class because a successful third-placed lift was completed in the clean and jerk but not for the snatch.

References

2009 in Cook Islands sport
2009 in weightlifting
2009 Mini